The Rocky Mountains Park Act was enacted on June 23, 1887, by the Parliament of Canada, establishing Banff National Park which was then known as "Rocky Mountains Park".  The act was modelled on the Yellowstone Park Act passed by the United States Congress in 1881.  The Rocky Mountains Park Act outlined the national park concept, balancing conservation and development interests.

References

Further reading 
 

Banff National Park
Environmental law in Canada

1880s in the environment
Canadian federal legislation
1887 in Canadian law